Leopoldsdorf im Marchfeld Airport  is a public use airport located 1 nm west of Leopoldsdorf im Marchfeld, Niederösterreich, Austria.

See also
List of airports in Austria

References

External links 
 Airport record for Leopoldsdorf im Marchfeld Airport at Landings.com

Airports in Lower Austria